Barnabás Szőllős (born 13 December 1998) is a Hungarian-born Israeli alpine ski racer born in Budapest, Hungary. Szőllős and his sister, alpine ski racer Noa Szőllős, were selected by the Olympic Committee of Israel to compete for Israel.
At the 2022 Winter Olympics, he finished 6th in the combined downhill, equaling the best-ever finish by Israel at the Winter Olympics. He was the only male alpine ski racer to finish all individual disciplines - and finishing all of them inside the top 30 - at the 2022 Winter Olympics.

His older brother is fellow alpine ski racer Benjamin Szőllős. His younger sister, Noa Szőllős, also competed for Israel at the 2022 Winter Olympics in Alpine skiing events.

World Championship results

References

External links
 
 Barnabás Szőllős Result at the International Ski Federation
 
 

Israeli male alpine skiers
Hungarian male alpine skiers
1998 births
Living people
People from Budapest
Alpine skiers at the 2016 Winter Youth Olympics
Alpine skiers at the 2022 Winter Olympics
Olympic alpine skiers of Israel